Gladiovalva pseudodorsella is a moth of the family Gelechiidae. It was described by Sattler in 1960. It is found in Morocco.

References

Moths described in 1960
Gladiovalva